Deh-e Darreh (also Romanized as  Deh-e Darreh, Deh Darah, and Deh Darreh) is a village in Qilab Rural District, Alvar-e Garmsiri District, Andimeshk County, Khuzestan Province, Iran. At the 2006 census, its population was 146, in 33 families.

References 

Populated places in Andimeshk County